"White Flag Warrior" is the official first single from Flobots' album Survival Story.  The song features a guest appearance from Tim McIlrath, lead singer of band Rise Against.

It is about the U.S. troops and war. It reached No. 22 on the Billboard Alternative Songs chart.

Charts

See also
List of anti-war songs

Songs about soldiers
2010 singles
2010 songs
Flobots songs
Universal Republic Records singles
Songs written by Tim McIlrath